Centemoposis is a genus of plants in the amaranth family, Amaranthaceae and is found in Africa distributed from Tropical Africa to South Africa.

The genus has 12 accepted species:

 Centemopsis biflora (Schinz) Schinz
 Centemopsis conferta (Schinz) Suess.
 Centemopsis fastigiata (Suess.) C.C.Townsend
 Centemopsis filiformis (E.A.Bruce) C.C.Townsend
 Centemopsis glomerata (Lopr.) Schinz
 Centemopsis gracilenta (Hiern) Schinz
 Centemopsis graminea (Suess. & Overk.) C.C.Townsend
 Centemopsis kirkii (Hook.fil.) Schinz
 Centemopsis longipedunculata (Peter) C.C.Townsend
 Centemopsis micrantha Chiov.
 Centemopsis sordida C.C.Townsend
 Centemopsis trinervis Hauman

Reference

Flora of Africa
Amaranthaceae genera
Amaranthaceae